"A Night to Remember" was an American television play broadcast live on March 28, 1956, as part of the NBC television series, Kraft Television Theatre. The play was based on Walter Lord's 1955 book, A Night to Remember, telling the story of the final night aboard the Titanic. George Roy Hill was the director.

The production was a major hit, attracting 28 million viewers and receiving positive reviews from critics.  It was nominated for five Emmy Awards (including best program, best writing, best live camera work, best directing, and best art direction). It won the Emmy for live camera work and also won two Sylvania Television Awards as the year's best television adaptation and for best technical production.

Plot
The play opens with narration by Claude Rains telling of an 1898 novel that seemingly presaged the Titanic tragedy and reviewing the history of the Titanic, its size, and capabilities.  The production then turns to the events of the ship's final night.

Thomas Andrews, the 39-year-old naval architect who built the Titanic, works in his state room. J. Bruce Ismay, president and managing director of the White Star Line, boasts of plans for a speed run the following morning. Ismay pulls an iceberg warning from his pocket and hands it to the ship's captain, Edward J. Smith. It was the third warning Capt. Smith had received that day.

The Titanic Salon Orchestra plays as Capt. Smith dines with the first-class passengers. At 7:30 p.m., the captain receives a fourth warning of icebergs in the ship's path. Four decks below, 712 souls travel in steerage. A young Irish couple performs a jig.

In the wireless room, at 9:30 p.m., another ice warning places the Titanic directly within the area of danger. The wireless operator is distracted by stacks of messages passengers wish to send.

At 10 p.m., the captain retires to his cabin.  At 10:30 p.m., the  spots an ice field and stops its engines to wait until morning before proceeding. At 11 p.m., the wire operator on the Californian sends a warning to other ships.  The Titanics wireless operator has difficulty understanding the message and replies, "Shut up. Shut up. I'm busy." In the first class smoking room, a small group remains, but otherwise quiet settles over the ship.

At 11:40 p.m., in the crow's nest, an iceberg is spotted directly ahead. A warning is sent to stop the engine, and the emergency doors are sealed. The Titanic strikes the iceberg. A number of passengers gather on the deck and discover pieces of the iceberg. Capt. Smith returns to the bridge and learns that the ship is taking on water. At 11:55 p.m., Thomas Andrews describes the damage to Capt. Smith and Ismay: The ship has suffered a 300-foot gash and will sink in no more than two hours. Capt. Smith orders the lifeboats readied and the passengers mustered, but no general alarm is to be sounded so as to avoid panic. The Titanic has only 16 lifeboats and four collapsibles, enough to hold only 1,000 of the 3,000 persons on board.

Capt. Smith directs the wireless operators to send out a distress call. The wire operator on the nearby Californian is off duty and does not receive the call. In a further effort to attract the attention of the Californian, Capt. Smith orders the firing of rockets. An officer aboard the Californian sees the rockets and notices the Titanic listing. Captain Lord of the Californian is notified but goes back to sleep. At 12:36 a.m., a ship replies to the Titanics distress call, but it is 58 miles away and will arrive too late.

In third class, the passengers are told there is no danger but that they should put on life jackets. The ship begins to list. At 12:15, the covers are removed from the lifeboats, and women and children begin boarding. At 12:42 a.m., the first life boat is lowered with only 20 persons, despite having a capacity of 40 persons. Another lifeboat is lowered with only 12 passengers.

The Titanic Salon Orchestra continues to play as the crew continues firing rockets with no response from the Californian. On one side of the ship, only women and children are permitted on the lifeboats.  On other side, the rule is relaxed, and Henry Harper boards a lifeboat with his prize Pekingese dog. An elderly couple, Mr. and Mrs. Isidore Strauss, refuses to be separated and remains on board. Lifeboats continue to be lowered. At 1:30, an officer fires his gun to control entry onto the lifeboats. At 1:46 a.m., Ismay asserts that there is an unclaimed place on one of the final lifeboats and takes it for himself. Claude Rains, who narrated throughout the telecast, intones, "At the time President Ismay left his ship, there remained on board 1,643 passengers, among them 168 women and 57 children". A small group of women and children had been allowed to evacuate earlier, the remaining steerage passengers were finally permitted to head to the deck shortly before 2 a.m. The final lifeboat is lowered at 2:05 a.m.

The captain gives leave for the wireless operators to abandon their posts with the directive "every man for himself." At 2:15 a.m., the orchestra, directed by Wallace Henry Hartley,  plays its final piece, the Episcopal hymn "Autumn". Many passengers jump into the freezing water in their life preservers. Andrews, making no attempt to escape, is killed by a falling chandelier as the ship sinks at 2:20 a.m. with 1,502 souls, including many children from steerage.

In the closing narration, Rains reviews the iceberg warnings that were not heeded, the lack of sufficient lifeboats, and the failure of the Californian to respond to the Titanics pleas. Rains closes with these words: "Never again has man been quite so confident. An age had come to an end."

Cast
The production included a cast of 107 actors, 72 with speaking parts.  Individual credits identifying the parts played were not provided either on screen or in advance press releases. On-screen credits simply listed the cast in order of appearance as follows:

 Claude Rains [narrator]Officers and crew of the Titanic
 Clarence Derwent [as Capt. Edward J. Smith]
 Don Marley
 Eric Micklewood
 Roger Evans Boxill
 Richard Newton
 David Cole
 Victor Thorley
 William Becker
 John Heldabrand
 Frank Leslie
 John Wynne Evans
 Peter Forster
 Stanley Lemin
 Dermot McNamara
 Leonard Stone
 Robert Brown
 Neil North [as Second Officer Charles Lightoller]
 Roger HamiltonFirst class passengers Millette Alexander [as Mrs. Astor]
 Peter Pagan
 Anthony Kemble Cooper
 Cavada Humphrey
 Joanna Roos
 Edgar Stehli [as Mr. Strauss]
 Valerie Cossart
 John Boruff
 Patrick Macnee [as Thomas Andrews]
 Woodrow Parfrey
 Ruth Matteson
 Tom Charles
 Jerome Kilty
 Larry Gates
 Peter Turgeon
 Clifford David
 Geoffrey Horne
 Wesley Lau
 Hugh Dunne
 Margo Lorenz
 June Evert
 Alfreda Wallace
 Frank Schofield
 Guy Sorel
 Mary K. Wells
 Al Markim
 Elizabeth Eustia
 Jim Lanphier
 Jean Cameron
 Roger Plowden
 Dorothy Rice
 Ellen ClarkThird class passengers Sandy Ackland
 Helena Carroll
 Liam Gannon
 Svea Grunfeld
 Michael Ingram
 Gina Petrushka
 Herman Schwedt
 Walter Burke
 Dan Morgan
 Michael GorrinStewards Marcel Hillaire
 John Mackwood
 Basil Howes
 Victor Wood
 Chrisse Hayward
 Drew Thompson
 George CathreyOfficers and crew, SS Californian Frederick Tozere [as Capt. Stanley Lord]
 Roy Dean
 Tom Martin
 Bradford Dillman
 Norman MorrisOther passengers on Titanic'''
 Helen Ludlam
 Gertrude Dallas
 Elinor Wright
 Laura Prikovits
 Kate Wilkinson
 Erlamond Trexler
 Anita Webb
 Billie Boldt
 Ann Chisholm
 Denise Morris
 Lydia Shaffer
 Claudia Crawford
 Eddie Applegate
 Cornelius Frizzell
 James Pritchett
 Mort Thompson
 Arthur Joseph
 Jeanne Palmer
 Jonathan Anderson
 Joe Hardy
 Ulla Kazanova
 Elizabeth Dewing
 Katherine Hynes
 Mary Brown
 Mavis Neal
 Diana Kemble
 Martine Bartlett
 Christine Linn
 Emile Belasco
 Patricia Carlisle
 Remo Pisani
 Patti Bosworth
 Merle Ashley

Production
In addition to 107 actors, the production used 31 studio sets, making it "the most complex live television show ever attempted."  According to NBC, the production budget was only $85,000.

George Roy Hill was the director. The production was based on Walter Lord's 1955 book, A Night to Remember. The story was adapted for television by George Roy Hill and John Whedon (grandfather of Joss Whedon). The art director, Duane McKinney, was responsible for design of the 31 sets. McKinney said that six cameras were used in the production, plus two in reserve. The large tanks had catwalks out of camera range for the actors to use, he said. The production was staged at NBC's Brooklyn Studios. The music was composed and conducted by Wladimir Selinsky.

On March 28, 1956, the production was broadcast nationwide on NBC as part of the long-running anthology series, Kraft Television Theatre.  The program was a major hit, attracting 28 million viewers and increasing sales of Lord's book. It was rerun on kinescope on May 2, 1956, five weeks after its first broadcast.

Awards
The program was nominated in five categories at the 9th Primetime Emmy Awards: best single program of the year; best teleplay writing (George Roy Hill and John Whedon); best direction (George Roy Hill); best live camera work; and best art direction (Duane McKinney). It won the Emmy for live camera work.

It also won two Sylvania Television Awards, as the year's best television adaptation and also for best technical production.

Reception
The production received positive reviews from critics.

In The New York Times, Jack Gould called it "technically brilliant", "a triumph", and "an extraordinary demonstration of staging technique that imparted a magnificent sense of physical dimension to the home screen." In addition to the "sheer magnitude and complexity" of the production, Gould also praised the "emotional tension and terrifying suspense" that were well sustained through the broadcast.

In The Boston Globe, Mary Cremmen called it "bitterly graphic" with an impact that "made a viewer wide-eyed with fear." She praised the production's pacing and its restraint in relying on suspense rather than the "screams and gushing water and crashing chandeliers" that characterized prior dramatizations of the Titanic'''s sinking.

Syndicated television critic John Crosby called it a "splendid" production and "an undertaking of great courage". He praised the sets depicting the ship's complicated innards as "done so well that we suddenly were practically on the ship". As a fan of live television, Crosby called it "a particularly happy event" in demonstrating the medium's capabilities.

In the New York Daily News, Ben Gross called it "a moving drama of courage and cowardice", "a TV show to remember", and one of the rare occasions when television departed from the road of mediocrity and proved that "TV occasionally can rise to great heights". He admired the "dignity and restraint" exercised in telling the tragic story "without indulging in the slightest sensationalism". He also praised the "air of authenticity" in the 31 sets, creating the illusion of being aboard the ship. He found the documentary, factual approach enhanced the "almost unbearable emotional impact".

The original airing earned a 28.9 Trendex rating, and the repeat airing earned an 18.9 Trendex rating.

References

1956 American television episodes
Works about RMS Titanic
1956 television plays
Kraft Television Theatre